Blastobasis inouei is a moth in the family Blastobasidae. It was described by Sigeru Moriuti in 1987. It is found in Russia and Japan.

References

Blastobasis
Moths described in 1987